Jacques La Ramée (June 8, 1784 – 1821) was a French-Canadian and Métis coureur des bois, frontiersman, trapper, fur trader, hunter, explorer, and mountain man who lived in what is now the U.S. state of Wyoming, having settled there in 1815. His name appears in several spellings, including La Ramee, Laramée, LaRamée, La Ramie, La Rami, La Remy, and Laramie. La Ramée is credited as an early explorer of what is now called the Laramie River of Wyoming and Colorado.  The city of Laramie, Wyoming, with an Americanized spelling, was later named for him.

Early life
Jacques La Ramée was born on June 8, 1784, in Québec, British Canada, to Joseph Fissiau dit Laramée and Jeanne Mondou. He has been described as Métis, or French-First Nation. 

Volume VI of the North West Company registry cites two Laramée brothers, Jacques and Joseph.  A variant of the name La Ramée was first documented in the western United States in 1798, referring to a canoe man who worked until 1804. This may have been Francois Laramée, who is also listed in the registry of the NW company. This La Ramée had several sons who ventured west into Wyoming and Idaho. According to Joachim Fromhold, one of the sons was the Jacques La Rami for whom the Laramie River was named.

According to Lakota writer Susan Bordeaux Bettelyoun, her father, fur trader James Bordeaux, was La Ramée's cousin and discovered his body after his death.

Fur trader and explorer
According to historian C. G. Coutant, Jacques La Ramée worked as a voyageur and fur trader for the North West Company and John Jacob Astor's American Fur Company. Employees of the North West Company and its rival, the Hudson's Bay Company, were in competition, and disputes at times turned violent. In 1821 the two feuding companies merged.

La Ramée was known for his character and peaceful reputation.  He organized a group of independent trappers, who set out in 1815 to find the headwaters of the North Platte River in the United States Unorganized Territory of present-day Wyoming. Coutant writes that La Ramée and his band of trappers befriended many Native American tribes, who would trade pelts to them for European goods. This enterprise established the free trapper rendezvous in Wyoming, where trappers represented themselves without middle-men or an umbrella company. According to journalist Jim McKee (citing Robert Stuart from 1812), free trappers would rendezvous each May on the Oregon Trail pathway along the shore of the North Platte River. La Ramée was a leader and was considered the trappers' spokesperson. He assigned trapping areas among the free traders.

LaRamée's rendezvous
In 1815, La Ramée organized a free-trapper rendezvous at the junction of the North Platte and what is now named the Laramie rivers. Later fur-trading companies held annual rendezvous here. For five years these events attracted more trappers and traders, and a trade market was established, in addition to routes to and from supply depots. In May, following the rendezvous, traders would arrange for transport of the pelts to Saint Louis, Missouri on bullboats via the Missouri river. Supplies were returned by keelboat or bullboat. La Ramée distributed supplies to the free trappers, and assigned their geographic trapping area for the coming season.

Death
La Ramée was known to have set off in 1820 to trap along what is now known as the Laramie River and its tributaries. He was never seen alive again. When he did not show up for the rendezvous, organizers initiated a search for him. Speculation on his disappearance and death vary.  It was said that he slipped on ice and fell into the Laramie River; or that his body was found in a small cabin; or that he was found "stuffed under a beaver dam"; or that he was killed by rival trappers or traders, and thrown into the Laramie River.  An alleged eyewitness account, from Pierre Lesperance, said that La Ramée's camp was attacked by Arapaho warriors, but the latter vigorously denied this.

Legacy
Several geographic sites in Wyoming were named for La Ramée (anglicized to Laramie), including the Laramie River, the city of Laramie, Fort Laramie, Laramie Peak, and Laramie County.

In popular culture
James A. Michener's 1974 historical novel, Centennial featured "Pasquinel", a French Métis coureur des bois from Montreal. He was portrayed as an early frontier mountain man and trapper in 1795 Colorado, then part of the Spanish Upper Louisiana Territory of Mexico. NBC television produced a mini-series adaptation of the same name, airing it in 1978-1979. Pasquinel was portrayed by American TV actor, Robert Conrad.  Pasquinel is believed to be loosely based on La Ramée.

See also
 Canadian canoe routes
 North American fur trade
 Rendezvous (fur trade)

References

External links 
 
 

Canadian fur traders
1784 births
1821 deaths
Mountain men
People of pre-statehood Wyoming
French-Canadian American history
North West Company people
French Quebecers